"Heart of the Storm" is the final episode of the television series Sir Arthur Conan Doyle's The Lost World.

"Heart of the Storm" is episode number 66 from season 3 and was originally aired on Monday May 13, 2002. The plotline of the show was due to be continued in the following season, as viewers were left with an incomplete story, however the show was canceled due to financial reasons.

See also
List of The Lost World episodes
Sir Arthur Conan Doyle's 1912 novel The Lost World

Trivia
 Peter McCauley, Rachel Blakely, and Will Snow are the only cast members who appeared in every episode.
 Lara Cox is listed as a "Special Guest Star".
 Peter McCauley, Rachel Blakely, Jennifer O'Dell, and Will Snow are the only cast members who appeared in both the First and the last Episodes.

External links

2002 American television episodes